Stone is a 1974 Australian outlaw biker film written, directed and produced by Sandy Harbutt. It is a low budget film by company Hedon Productions.

Police officer Stone goes undercover with the Gravediggers outlaw motorcycle gang, to find out who is murdering their members, one by one.

The film stars Ken Shorter and features Rebecca Gilling, Bill Hunter and Helen Morse. The film's soundtrack was composed by Billy Green and featured some members of his group Sanctuary. Motorcycles featured include the legendary Kawasaki Z1(900). Stone initially rides a Norton.

The promotional trailer video features narration by radio and media personality John Laws. The film was featured in the documentary, Not Quite Hollywood, in which Quentin Tarantino enthuses about his admiration for the film.

Australian stuntman Peter Armstrong set a then-world record for riding a motorcycle off an 80-foot cliff to fall headfirst into the sea.

Plot
When several members of the GraveDiggers outlaw motorcycle club are murdered, Sydney detective Stone (Ken Shorter) is sent to investigate. Led by the Undertaker (Sandy Harbutt), a Vietnam war veteran, the GraveDiggers allow Stone to pose as a gang member. Leaving behind society girlfriend Amanda (Helen Morse), Stone begins to identify with the Undertaker and his comrades Hooks (Roger Ward), Toad (Hugh Keays-Byrne), Dr Death (Vincent Gil), Captain Midnight (Bindi Williams), Septic (Dewey Hungerford) and Vanessa (Rebecca Gilling), the Undertaker’s girlfriend. Amid violent confrontations with the Black Hawks, a rival gang the GraveDiggers hold responsible, Stone uncovers a political conspiracy behind the killings. When the truth is revealed, Stone must choose between his job and his loyalty to the GraveDiggers.

Cast

Ken Shorter as Stone
Sandy Harbutt as Undertaker
Helen Morse as Amanda
Hugh Keays-Byrne as Toad
Vincent Gil as Dr. Death 
Bindi Williams as Captain Midnight
James H. Bowles as Stinkfinger
Rebecca Gilling as Vanessa
Roger Ward as Hooks
Lex Mitchell as Ballini
Susan Lloyd as Tart
Dewey Hungerford as Septic
Slim de Grey as Inspector Hannigan
Owen Weingott as Alder
Michael Robinson as Pinball
Ros Spiers as Whore
Bill Hunter as Barman
Billy Green as 69
Deryck Barnes as Doctor Townes
Harry Lawrence as Caretaker
Garry McDonald as Mechanic
Terry Bader as Hamburger
Drew Forsythe as Fred
Fred Scheiwiller as Ted
Tony Allyn as Birdman
Reg Evans as Solicitor
Bruce McPherson as Go Down
Jim Walsh as Bad Max
John Ifkovitch as Zonk
Rhod Walker as Chairman
Ray Bennett as Sergeant Larson
Neville Overall as Scrag
Barry Butler as Buzzard
Peter King as Ferret
David Bracks as Boots
Lachlan Jamieson as Hip
Ros Talamini as Sunshine
Victoria Anoux as Flossie
Jane Gilling as Eurydice
Margaret Ure as Jay
Jude Matthews as Blue
Eva Ifkovitch as Tiger
Julie Edwards as Karma
Karyn Love as Skunk

Production
Sandy Harbutt got the idea in 1970 when he wrote a script for an episode of the TV police series The Long Arm in which he was appearing.

Filmink magazine said "The biker movie was the modern day Western of choice in the 1960s" but argued this was one of the few Australian films to "embrace it as a story option."

The Australian Film Development Corporation invested $154,000 in the film. The remainder of the budget and most of the technical facilities were provided by Ross Wood Productions in Sydney. The movie was shot in late 1973.

The Hells Angels club (Sydney) provided assistance during production.

Release
Although Stone was given an "R" rating it grossed $1,572,000 at the box office in Australia, which is equivalent to $10,611,000 in 2009 dollars. It made a profit to its investors within 18 months.

Charts
The soundtrack was released by Warner Bros. (600002)

Influence
Several of the cast went on to appear in Mad Max (1979), including Hugh Keays-Byrne, Roger Ward, Vincent Gil, David Bracks and Reg Evans.

Stone Forever

Stone Forever is a 1999 documentary about Stone. Richard Kuipers was contacted by David Hannay and Sandy Harbutt to film a bike ride commemorating the film's 25th anniversary, which led to a full documentary about the impact of the film and the fate of the people who made it.

See also
Cinema of Australia

References

External links

Stone at the National Film and Sound Archive
STONE at The "Oz Film Database" Australian Film Database at Murdoch University
 STONE FOREVER -25 Years of Stone at the "Urban Cinefile" database
 The official site of the Stone movie remake - currently in development
Article in FilmInk about STONE and the remake
Milesago
Stone Forever at Australian Screen Online

Stone at Oz Film
Stone Forever at Oz Film

1974 films
1974 action films
Australian action films
1974 independent films
Police detective films
Outlaw biker films
Australian independent films
1970s English-language films